La Loi ('The Law') was a daily newspaper published from Paris, France, founded in 1880 by A. Chevalier-Maresq. La Loi was dedicated to covering legal issues. As of the mid-1930s, H. Frennelet was the director of the newspaper.

Background
In 1888, Chevalier-Maresq sued a printer who republished the correctional police chronicles published by La Loi, but his request was denied because the initial writers of those chronicles, the police, did not complain about the reproduction of their work.

References

1880 establishments in France
Defunct newspapers published in France
Newspapers published in Paris
Newspapers established in 1880
Publications with year of disestablishment missing
Daily newspapers published in France